The Raja Ampat pitohui (Pitohui cerviniventris), or Waigeo pitohui, is a species of pitohui in the family Oriolidae found on the western Papuan Islands of New Guinea. Its natural habitat is subtropical or tropical moist lowland forests. It is also one of the few known poisonous birds.

Taxonomy and systematics
This species was split from the northern variable pitohui in 2013.

Subspecies
Two subspecies are recognized: 
 P. c. pallidus - van Oort, 1907: Found on Sagewin and Batanta Islands (western Papuan Islands)
 P. c. cerviniventris - (Gray, GR, 1862): Found on Waigeo and Gemien Islands (western Papuan Islands)

References

Pitohui
Pitohui (genus)
Birds described in 1862
Taxa named by George Robert Gray